The 2013–14 Rhino Club Challenge is the 3rd season of the Rhino Cup, the first division of professional rugby league in South Africa. The contest takes between September 7 and November 30. There are 4 teams, with the TUKS Blues winning the premiership, and the Middelburg Tigers becoming the runners-up.

Competition Rules
There are five participating clubs in the 2013 Rhino Cup. 
Teams received three points for a win and two points for a draw. One Bonus point is awarded to teams that score within twelve or less points in a game. Teams were ranked by log points, then points difference (points scored less points conceded).

The top two teams qualify for the title play-off.

Teams

Ladder

Fixtures and results
The 2013 Rhino fixtures and results are as follows:
 All times are South African (GMT+2).

Regular season

September 2013

October 2013

November 2013

Final

References

2013 in rugby league
South Africa Rugby League
Rhino Club Challenge
Rug
Rug